David Pfeil is a retired American soccer midfielder who played professionally in the USISL,  Major Indoor Soccer League and Continental Indoor Soccer League.  He was a member of the United States men's national under-20 soccer team at the 1987 FIFA World Youth Championship.

Pfeil graduated from Kimball High School where he was a four year varsity soccer player.  Pfeil attended Southern Methodist University, playing on the men’s soccer team from 1986 to 1990.

In 1991, Pfeil joined the Dallas Rockets of the USISL.  He played for them through 1994.  In the fall of 1991, he signed with the Dallas Sidekicks of the Major Indoor Soccer League.  The MISL collapsed at the end of the season and the Sidekicks moved to the Continental Indoor Soccer League.  Pfeil continued to play for the Sidekicks in 1993 and 1994.

Pfeil played for the United States men's national under-20 soccer team at the 1987 FIFA World Youth Championship.

References

External links
 MISL stats
 Coaching bio
 Dallas Sidekicks: David Pfeil

Living people
1967 births
American soccer coaches
American soccer players
Continental Indoor Soccer League players
Dallas Rockets players
Dallas Sidekicks (original MISL) players
Dallas Sidekicks (CISL) players
Major Indoor Soccer League (1978–1992) players
SMU Mustangs men's soccer players
USISL players
Association football midfielders